High Won-High Two is the second studio album released by jazz pianist Dave Burrell. It was recorded on February 9, 1968 and was first released as an LP record later that year by Black Lion Records.

Track listing
"West Side Story Medley" — 19:49
"Oozi Oozi" — 3:10
"Bittersweet Reminiscence" — 3:45
"Bobby and Si" — 2:11
"Dave Blue" — 2:38
"Margie Pargie (A.M. Rag)" — 2:59
"East Side Colors" — 15:50
"Theme Stream/Dave Blue/Bittersweet Reminiscence/Bobby and Si/M" — 15:33
Track 1 credited to Leonard Bernstein; all others are by Burrell.

Personnel 
Dave Burrell — piano, arranger
Norris Sirone Jones — bass
Bobby Kapp, Sunny Murray — drums
Pharoah Sanders — tambourine

Production:
Stanley Crouch — liner notes
Michael Cuscuna, Alan Douglas — producer
Raymond Ross — photography
Malcolm Walker — design

External links 
 

1968 albums
Dave Burrell albums
Albums produced by Michael Cuscuna
Freedom Records albums
Black Lion Records albums
Albums produced by Alan Douglas (record producer)